Oscar Prudente (born 9 January 1944) is an Italian pop-rock singer-songwriter, arranger, musician and composer.

Career 
Born in Rossiglione, Genoa, at young age Prudente studied drums, piano and guitar. At fifteen, while attending the high school, he was chosen by Colin Hicks as the drummer for his European tour. Back in Italy, he became the drummer of Luigi Tenco for his live performances; noticed by the record producer Nanni Ricordi, he released several singles in the sixties, entering the competition at several music festivals including Cantagiro and Un disco per l'estate.

The turning point of his career was the encounter with Ivano Fossati, with whom he composed several hits of the progressive rock group Delirium and with whom, after that Fossati left the group, he released the album Poco prima dell'aurora. Fossati and Prudente also composed songs for several other artists, including the hit "Pensiero stupendo" for Patty Pravo, that peaked at first place on the Italian hit parade.

References

External links

 
 

1944 births
Musicians from the Province of Genoa
Italian pop singers
Italian pop musicians
Living people
Italian film score composers
Italian male film score composers
Italian drummers
Male drummers
Italian singer-songwriters
Italian rock singers
Italian music arrangers